The Juliana Sports Field is one of two public recreational areas on the Caribbean island of Saba, along with the Cruyff Court Saba, and is located in the capital of The Bottom.

History
The facility was first opened in the 1970s on the property of the former croquet field. During her trip to the island Juliana of the Netherlands visited the facility, giving it its present name. In 2013 King Willem-Alexander and Queen Maxima also visited the Sports Field. It underwent a four-month renovation which included a new surface for the basketball court which was completed in February 2021. It also contains a netball court.

References

Sports venues in Saba
Buildings and structures in The Bottom
The Bottom